Li Wenjie (born 10 June 1968) is a Chinese sport shooter who competed in the 1996 Summer Olympics.

References

1968 births
Living people
Chinese male sport shooters
ISSF rifle shooters
Olympic shooters of China
Shooters at the 1996 Summer Olympics
Shooters at the 1994 Asian Games
Shooters at the 1998 Asian Games
Asian Games medalists in shooting
Asian Games gold medalists for China
Asian Games silver medalists for China
Asian Games bronze medalists for China
Medalists at the 1994 Asian Games
Medalists at the 1998 Asian Games
20th-century Chinese people